Santiago Álvarez may refer to:

 Santiago Álvarez (general) (1872–1930), Filipino revolutionary general
 Santiago Álvarez (filmmaker) (1919–1998), Cuban filmmaker
 Santiago Álvarez (rugby union) (born 1994), Argentine rugby sevens player